Silver chalice may refer to:

The Silver Chalice, a 1952 historical novel by Thomas B. Costain
The Silver Chalice (film), a 1954 adaptation of the book, starring Paul Newman
Silver Chalice Wica, an American Wiccan tradition which formed the basis of Universal Eclectic Wicca